The men's 100 metre breaststroke at the 2007 World Aquatics Championships took place on 25 March (heats and semifinals) and on the evening of 26 March (final)  at Rod Laver Arena in Melbourne, Australia. 123 swimmers were entered in the event, of which 117 swam.

Existing records at the start of the event were:
World record (WR): 59.13, Brendan Hansen (USA), 1 August 2006 in Irvine, USA.
Championship record (CR): 59.37, Brendan Hansen (USA), Montreal 2005 (25 July 2005)

Results

Final

Semifinals

Heats

Swim-off for semis (16th place)
 Roman Sloudnov, Russia – 1:01.97 (Q)
 Robin van Aggele, Netherlands – 1:02.54

See also
 Swimming at the 2005 World Aquatics Championships – Men's 100 metre breaststroke (previous Worlds)
 Swimming at the 2008 Summer Olympics – Men's 100 metre breaststroke (next year's top event)
 Swimming at the 2009 World Aquatics Championships – Men's 100 metre breaststroke (next Worlds)

References

Swimming at the 2007 World Aquatics Championships